Wanna Be Loved may refer to:

"Wanna Be Loved" (Buju Banton song), released in 1995
"Wanna Be Loved", a song by Michael Rune featuring Natascha Bessez, runner up in Dansk Melodi Grand Prix 2014
"Wanna Be Loved", a song by DC Talk in their 1998 album Supernatural
"Wanna Be Loved", a song by John Legend from his 2013 album Love in the Future